Hen Island is an island on Lake Erie in Ontario. There are three smaller islands, called "chickens," surrounding the island; their names are Big Chicken Island, Chick Island, and Little Chicken Island.

Quinnebog Fishing Club
This small wooded Island is home to the Quinnebog Club, which owns the island. The club was founded in 1897, still exists and is active. The main clubhouse holds the dining hall and kitchen facilities as well as staff bedrooms on the second floor. According to the club's website the U.S. Presidents Grover Cleveland and William McKinley have visited the club to do some fishing.

The Club may have bought the island from either a certain "Colonel Blanchard", the first resident of the island, or Rudolph Siefield, an Ohio businessman.

Notes

External links 
Quinnebog Fishing Club's website
 

Islands of Lake Erie in Ontario